Otoferlin is a protein that in humans is encoded by the OTOF gene.

Function 

Mutations in this gene are a cause of neurosensory nonsyndromic recessive deafness, DFNB9. The short form of the encoded protein has three C2 domains, a single carboxy-terminal transmembrane domain found also in the C. elegans spermatogenesis factor FER-1 and human dysferlin, while the long form has six C2 domains. Otoferlin homologous proteins in humans that have been shown to be associated with human diseases are dysferlin and myoferlin. Both dysferlin and myoferlin have seven C2 domains. C2A in otoferlin's longer form with six C2 domains is structurally similar to dysferlin C2A. However, the loop 1 in calcium binding site of otoferlin C2A is significantly shorter than the homologous loop in dysferlin and myoferlin C2A domains. Therefore, it is unable to bind to calcium. Otoferlin C2A is also unable to bind to phospholipids and hence it is structurally and functionally different from other C2 domains. The homology suggests that this protein may be involved in vesicle membrane fusion. Similar to dysferlin and myoferlin, otoferlin has a FerA domain and its FerA domain has been shown to interact with zwitterionic lipids in a calcium-dependent manner and with negatively charged lipids in a calcium-independent manner. The estimated charge of FerA domain among ferlin proteins varies significantly. At pH 7, the estimated charge of dysferlin is -8.4 while otoferlin FerA is +8.5. Several transcript variants encoding multiple isoforms have been found for this gene.

References

External links 
 GeneReviews/NCBI/NIH/UW entry on OTOF-Related Deafness

Further reading